Elisa & Marcela is a 2019 Spanish biographical romantic drama film directed by Isabel Coixet. Starring Natalia de Molina and Greta Fernández, the plot concerns the story of Elisa Sánchez Loriga and Marcela Gracia Ibeas, two women who posed as a heterosexual couple in order to marry in 1901 at Church of Saint George in A Coruña becoming the first same-sex matrimony recorded in Spain.

Plot
A young woman travels to the house of Marcela in Chubut Province, Argentina. After a meal, Marcela begins to tell her story from 27 years ago.

The year was 1898. Marcela attended a Catholic school in A Coruña, where she met Elisa, an older student. The two formed a quick friendship.

The two girls spent a day frolicking on the beach, where Elisa said it was the happiest day in her life. Marcela's traditional father became increasingly suspicious of the two girls' relationships, and sent Marcela off to boarding school, in Madrid. The distance didn't stop their relationship and they wrote letters during their time apart.

Three years later both of them were teachers at Cuoso, Galicia, where they began living together. The villagers however became suspicious and attacked Elisa.

They devised an escape plan. Elisa left for a few days, and returned dressed as a man, taking the identity of her deceased cousin Mario. In the meantime, Marcela got herself impregnated by local woodcutter Andrés.

Marcela and "Mario" were married by the local priest. The villagers became increasingly violent and a mob attacked their house.

They escaped to Portugal where they worked odd jobs for a fare to Argentina. They were arrested and Marcela gave birth to a girl, Ana. The Spanish authorities wanted to extradite them, where they would face 10–20 years in jail. The governor didn't want to do that and ordered the warden to let them go. Marcela didn't want Ana to grow up facing discrimination for having gay parents, so she left Ana in the care of the warden and his wife.

Back to the present in Argentina, the young woman we now know as Ana, asked Marcela was it worth it. Marcela didn't answer, instead she went to greet Elisa who just returned home.

A postscript notes same-sex marriage was legalized in Spain in 2005.

Cast
 Natalia de Molina as Elisa
 Greta Fernández as Marcela
 Sara Casasnovas as Ana
 Tamar Novas as Andrés
 María Pujalte as Marcela's mother
 Francesc Orella as Marcela's father
 Manolo Solo as the Warden
 Lluís Homar as Governor Oporto

Production 
The film was produced by Movies Production 2017 AIE, Zenit Televisión, Lanube Películas and Rodar y Rodar.

Release 
Elisa & Marcela was selected to compete for the Golden Bear at the 69th Berlin International Film Festival, where it screened on 13 February 2019. It was released on 24 May 2019, in selected theaters in Spain, and on 7 June 2019, by Netflix.

Critical reception
The website's critics consensus reads: "While it may be visually attractive, Elisa & Marcela is an underwhelming melodrama that lacks passion and energy."

Jay Weissberg from Variety defined it "a dully made, frequently ridiculous eye-roller shot in standard issue black-and-white that gussies itself up as a brave clarion call for gay rights", while Lee Marshall from Screen considered Coixet's work "a conventional and predictably plotted period drama (...) [It] misses no opportunity to make forbidden love look as classy as a perfume ad." Clarence Tsui from The Hollywood Reporter acknowledged that "wanting to make a point, the filmmaker has delivered a piece devoid of the emotional nuances that made Brokeback Mountain or Carol, to cite two seminal same-sex love stories, such gripping and heartbreaking viewing."

See also
 List of Spanish films of 2019

References

External links
 
 

2019 films
2019 biographical drama films
2019 LGBT-related films
2019 romantic drama films
Spanish biographical drama films
Spanish black-and-white films
Spanish LGBT-related films
2010s Spanish-language films
Spanish romantic drama films
Fictional LGBT couples
Films directed by Isabel Coixet
Lesbian-related films
LGBT-related romantic drama films
Biographical films about LGBT people
Rodar y Rodar films
2010s Spanish films